Athletics Club Fola Esch is a professional athletics club in Esch-sur-Alzette, in south-western Luxembourg.  Founded in 1950, the club is based at Stade Émile Mayrisch, which it shares with its sister football club, CS Fola Esch, in the south of the city.

External links
 CA Fola Esch official website
CA Fola Esch Official Instagram

Fola Esch
Sports teams in Esch-sur-Alzette
Sports clubs established in 1950
1950 establishments in Luxembourg